Zen Cart is an online store management system. It is PHP-based, using a MySQL database and HTML components. Support is provided for numerous languages and currencies, and it is freely available under the GNU General Public License.

History
Zen Cart is a software fork that branched from osCommerce in 2003. Beyond some aesthetic changes, the major differences between the two systems come from Zen Cart's architectural changes (for example, a template system) and additional included features in the core. The release of the 1.3.x series further differentiated Zen Cart by moving the template system from its historic tables-based layout approach to one that is largely CSS-based.

Plugins 
As support for Zen Cart dropped in recent years, many third party companies are creating Zencart plugins and modules that can help users solve problems like installing reCAPTCHA v3

See also

 Comparison of shopping cart software

References

External links

 

Free e-commerce software
Free software programmed in PHP
Content management systems
Software forks